Alfredo Vera Vera (1910–1999) was an Ecuadorian politician.

1910 births
1999 deaths
Ecuadorian politicians